Elliott James Murphy (born March 16, 1949) is an American rock singer-songwriter, novelist, record producer and journalist living in Paris.

Biography

Elliott Murphy was born in Rockville Centre, New York, grew up in Garden City, Long Island and began playing the guitar at age twelve. His band The Rapscallions won the 1966 New York State Battle of the Bands. In 1971 he travelled to Europe and appeared in the Federico Fellini film Roma Returning to New York, in 1973 he secured a record contract with Polydor Records after being noticed by rock critic Paul Nelson.  In 1988, he returned to college studies he had given up in the 1960s, and completed his bachelor's degree at Empire State College.

His debut album Aquashow (1973) was critically acclaimed and favorably reviewed in Rolling Stone, Newsweek and The New Yorker.  Follow up albums included Lost Generation (1975) produced by Doors Producer Paul A. Rothchild, Night Lights (1976) and Just a Story from America (1977). Special guests on Murphy's album have included Bruce Springsteen, Mick Taylor, Billy Joel, Phil Collins, Sonny Landreth, David Johansen, The Violent Femmes, Cindy Bullens and Shawn Colvin.  To date, he has released over thirty-five albums including,  Affairs (1980), Murph the Surf (1982). In 1985 Jerry Harrison of the Talking Heads produced the album Milwaukee. Selling the Gold (1995) featured a duet, "Everything I Do", with Bruce Springsteen.  The album also has a collaboration with the Violent Femmes: all three original members Gordon Gano, Victor DeLorenzo, Brian Ritchie appear on the track "King of the Serpentine".

The albums Beauregard, Rainy Season, Soul Surfing and La Terre Commune (a duo with Iain Matthews) followed.  Never Say Never...The Best of 1995–2005, a CD and DVD of performances was released in 2005. The year ended with Murphy Gets Muddy, an album of 9 classic blues covers and 5 Murphy blues originals. In early 2007 the album Coming Home Again was released in Europe. Murphy's 30th studio album, Notes from the Underground, came out in 2008 and he returned to the United States. A live CD/DVD-set "Alive in Paris" was released in the fall 2009 followed by the self-titled "Elliott Murphy" (2010), "Just A Story from New York" (2011) and "It Takes A Worried Man" which was produced by his son Gaspard Murphy. All Music Guide has rated over fifteen of his albums with 4 stars or more

In addition to his music and song lyrics Murphy has written for Rolling Stone, Spin, Mucchio Selvaggio, Jam and various European magazines and has published Cold & Electric, a semi-autobiographical novel, in French, German and Spanish editions, as well as two short story collections (The Lion Sleeps Tonight and Where the Women Are Naked and the Men Are Rich) and in 2003 Café Notes (Hachette, France). In 2012 the complete version of Cold & Electric re-titled "Marty May" was published by Joelle Losfeld/Gallimard.

On October 1, 2012, Elliott Murphy was awarded the Médaille de Vermeil de la Ville de Paris in a ceremony at the Hôtel de Ville presided by Paris Mayor Bertrand Delanoë for recognition of his career as a musician and author.

On November 4, 2015 Elliott Murphy was decorated with the Chevalier Ordre des Arts et des Lettres in a ceremony at the Mairie of the 4th Arrondissement in Paris.

In 2018 he was inducted into the Long Island Music Hall of Fame by Billy Joel

A biography of Elliott Murphy, "Hardcore", written by Charles Pitter, was published in 2013.

The Second Act of Elliott Murphy

In 2015, the documentary film, The Second Act of Elliott Murphy, by Spanish director Jorge Arenillas, detailing the transition of Murphy's career from the US to Europe was released on Mirabal Films. The film won the Audience Prize award at the 2016 Dock of the Bay film festival in San Sebastian, Spain and included interviews with both Bruce Springsteen and Billy Joel.

Broken Poet

In 2018, Elliott Murphy starred in the film, Broken Poet, by Spanish director Emilio Ruiz Barrachina, adapted from the Elliott Murphy short-story The Lion Sleeps Tonight. Also starring in the film are Marisa Berenson, Michael O'Keefe, Joana Preiss and a cameo appearance by Bruce Springsteen and Patti Scialfa.

Discography and books

Albums and EPs
 Aquashow (1973)
 Lost Generation (1975)
 Night Lights (1976)
 Just A Story From America (1977)
 Affairs (1980)
 Murph the Surf (1982)
 Party Girls / Broken Poets (1984)
 Milwaukee (1985)
 Change Will Come (1987)
 Après le Déluge (1987)
 If Poets Were Kings (1991)
 12 (1990) US re-edition: Unreal City (1993)
 Selling the Gold (1995)
 Beauregard (1998)
 Rainy Season (2000)
 La terre commune with Iain Matthews (2001)
 Soul Surfing (2002)
 Soul Surfing – the Next Wave EP (2002)
 Strings of the Storm (2003)
 Murphy Gets Muddy CD/DVD (2005)
 Coming Home Again (2007)
 Notes from the Underground (2008)
 Elliott Murphy (2011)
 It Takes A Worried Man (2013)
 Intime (2014)
 Aquashow Deconstructed (2015)
 Prodigal Son (2017)
 Ricochet (2019)
 The Middle Kingdom (2020)
 Wonder (2022)

Vintage Series
 1 Aquashow & Just A Story From America Demos
 2 The Night Lights Band Live
 3 Hello Long Island 1974
 4 The Murphys
 5 Gramercy Park
 6 Electric Murphyland
 7 Double E
 8 Live In Texas DVD
 9 The Paris Concerts: Eldorado 1981 Like Boats Against the Current 
 10 Gold Demos

Compilation albums
 Diamonds by the Yard (1991)
 Paris/New York (1992)
 Going Through Something – the Best of 1982–1991 (1996)
 Never Say Never – the Best of 1995–2003 & Live DVD (2005)

Live albums
 Live Hot Point (1991)
 April – a Live Album (1999)
 The Last of the Rock Stars... and Me and You (2001)
 Alive in Paris (2009)
 Just A Story From New York (2011)
 Just for One Day (2011)
 Elliott Murphy is Alive! (2018)
 Live in Bilbao (2021)

Film Soundtrack albums
 Broken Poet (2020)

Misc albums
 Poetic Justice (2015)

Books
Cold and Electric (Frío y eléctrico, Madrid, 1989, Ediciones Clips). Paris: L'Entreligne, 1989. 
Where the Women Are Naked and the Men Are Rich (Donde Las Mujeres Estan Desnudas Y Los Hombres Son Ricos). Madrid: Celeste Ediciones, 1996. 
 The Lion Sleeps Tonight (El león duerme esta noche, Barcelona, 1990, Ed. Stultilfera Navis)
 Café Notes Hachette (2002) 
Note al caffé. Italy: FBE Edizioni, 2004. 2004. 
Poetic Justice. Paris: Hachette Littératures, 2005.  
Il mio nome e John Little. Italy: FBE Edizioni, 2005. 2007. 
Poetic Justice. Elliott Murphy Books, 2012. 
Marty May. Joelle Losefeld/Gallimard, 2013. 
Forty Poems in Forty Nights. Elliott Murphy Books, 2016. 
Paris Stories. Elliott Murphy Books, 2016. 
Tramps. Murphyland Books, 2018. 
Diamonds by the Yard. Murphyland Books, 2019. 
Just a story from America - A memoir.  Murphyland Books. 2019.

Novels
Poetic Justice. New York: Elliott Murphy Books, 2012.

References

External links
Elliott Murphy Official Website

1949 births
Living people
21st-century American novelists
American male journalists
American male novelists
People from Garden City, New York
American expatriates in France
Singer-songwriters from New York (state)
21st-century American male writers
Novelists from New York (state)
21st-century American non-fiction writers